Samut Sakhon (Pronunciation) is a City in Thailand, capital of Samut Sakhon province. It is a stop on the Maeklong Railway. Samut Sakhon is 48 km from Bangkok.
It is part of the Bangkok Metropolitan Region.

Name
Samut Sakhon was formerly called Tha Chin (Chinese Pier) probably because, in the old days, it had been a trading port for a vast number of Chinese junks. In 1548, a City named Sakhon Buri was established at the mouth of the Tha Chin River. It was a center for recruiting troops from various seaside towns. The name of the city was changed to Mahachai when Klong (canal) Mahachai was dug in 1704 to connect the Tha Chin River to the city. Later, the city was renamed Samut Sakhon by King Rama IV but it is still popularly called Mahachai by its residents.

References

External links

Populated places in Samut Sakhon province